Prostitution in Ethiopia is legal, and widespread. Procuring (operating brothels, benefiting from prostitution, etc.) is illegal according to Article 634 of the Ethiopian Penal Code, as revised May 2005, however these laws are rarely enforced. Some feel it has contributed to the increased incidence of AIDS. UNAIDS estimate there are over 19,000 prostitutes in the major cities.

Ethiopia has become a magnet for sex tourism, including child sex tourism.

In 2015, Ethiopian scriptwriter and film director, Hermon Hailay, directed the film Price of Love, which was inspired by her experiences growing up close to prostitutes.

Sex trafficking

Ethiopia is a source and, to a lesser extent, destination and transit country for women and children subjected to sex trafficking. Saudi Arabia remains the primary destination for irregular migrants; reportedly, over 400,000 Ethiopians reside there. Saudi officials regularly deport Ethiopians in large numbers, and many of the deportees reported instances of sexual exploitation. Ethiopian women who migrate for work or flee abusive employers in the Middle East are also vulnerable to sex trafficking. An international organization assesses that most traffickers are small local operators, often from the victims’ own communities, but that well-organized crime groups are also responsible for irregular migrants becoming highly susceptible to trafficking. Labor recruiters target young people from Ethiopia's vast rural areas with promises of a better life. Although reports remain anecdotal, the severe drought in 2015-2016 may have resulted in an increase in internal trafficking. Girls from Ethiopia's impoverished rural areas are exploited in commercial sex within the country. Addis Ababa’s central market is the site of numerous brothels, where some young girls are exploited in commercial sex. Ethiopian girls are exploited in commercial sex in neighbouring African countries, particularly Sudan. Child sex tourism continues to be a problem in major hubs, including Addis Ababa, Bahir Dar, Hawassa, and Bishoftu; reports identify mostly Ethiopian-born perpetrators, including members of the diaspora, with known links to local hotels, brokers, and taxi drivers.

In 2016, federal and regional justice officials investigated 1,392 potential trafficking cases and convicted 640 traffickers under the 2015 anti-trafficking law, a significant increase from 69 convictions in 2015.

The United States Department of State Office to Monitor and Combat Trafficking in Persons ranks Ethiopia as a 'Tier 2' country.

References

Society of Ethiopia
Ethiopia
Ethiopia